Lake Hamilton School District 5 is a school district in Garland County, Arkansas.

It includes Crystal Springs, Pearcy, Rockwell, and much of Piney. A very small portion of Hot Springs extends into this district. The district does not include the census-designated place of Lake Hamilton.

References

External links
 

Education in Garland County, Arkansas
School districts in Arkansas